The women's 4 × 100 metres relay at the 2022 Commonwealth Games, as part of the athletics programme, is taking place at the Alexander Stadium on 6 August & 7 August 2022.

Records
Prior to this competition, the existing world and Games records were as follows:

Schedule
The schedule was as follows:

Results

First round
The first three in each heat (Q) and the next two fastest (q) qualified for the final.

Final
The medals were determined in the final.

References

Women's 4 x 100 metres relay
2022
2022 in women's athletics